The Filbasket 2022 Summer Championship, officially known as the Filbasket 2022 Summer Championship - Puregold for sponsorship reasons, was the second season of the Filbasket and first as a professional league. The league tournament follows the Filbasket Subic Championship which was held in late 2021.

Starting this tournament, it is expected that Filbasket would be organized as a professional tournament sanctioned by the government's Games and Amusements Board. Filbasket started the process of turning into a professional league recognized by the GAB on February 22, 2022.

The 2022 season commenced on March 18, 2022.

Teams
A guest team from Malaysia, the Kuala Lumpur Aseel is also set to participate.

Elimination round

Team standings

Results

Playoff bracket

Quarterfinals

Tanduay vs Muntinlupa

Nueva Ecija vs Kuala Lumpur

All-Star Bacolod vs AFP-FSD Makati

Pasig Sta. Lucia vs San Juan

Semifinals 

The semifinals is a best-of-three series.

Tanduay vs San Juan

Nueva Ecija vs All-Star Bacolod

Finals 

The finals is a best-of-three series.

Game One

Game Two

Game Three

References

Filbasket
2022–23 in Philippine basketball leagues
2022, Summer